Phamartes is a genus of Asian stick insects in the tribe Necrosciini identified by J Bresseel and J Constant in 2013.  As of 2022, species have only been recorded as originating from Vietnam.  The genus was named after the Prof. Thai Hong Pham of the Vietnam National Museum of Nature (Bảo tàng Thiên nhiên Việt Nam).

Description
Bresseel and Constant noted that this genus is closely related to Oxyartes, but is "easily distinguishable by the presence of fully developed alae, or rounded apical tegmina, possibly with protruding humps (whereas all known Oxyartes species have only tiny wing buds), the head armature, and the split and asymmetrical anal segment, a character previously unknown in Necrosciinae".

Species
The Phasmida Species File currently includes:
 Phamartes coronatus Bresseel & Constant, 2013 - type species - locality Bạch Mã National Park
 Phamartes elongatus Li & Bu, 2019 - locality Cát Tiên National Park

References

External links

Phasmatodea genera
Phasmatodea of Asia
Lonchodidae